"Harry Truman" is a song written by Robert Lamm for the group Chicago and recorded for their album Chicago VIII (1975), with lead vocals by Lamm. The first single released from that album, it reached number 13 on the U.S. Billboard Hot 100.  It also reached number 23 on the Adult Contemporary chart. In Canada, the song peaked at number 16.

Written after the resignation of U.S. President Richard Nixon, the lyrics are a tribute to a former President that Lamm felt the American people could trust — straight-talking Harry S. Truman. "America needs you, Harry Truman".

Cash Box said that it "starts out sounding like a Randy Newman song and evolves into a Beatlesque romp." Record World called it a "nostalgic search for the elements of true heroics."

Despite its popularity at the time, the Beatlesque "Harry Truman" only appears on three of Chicago's compilation albums: Group Portrait (now out of print) and The Box, plus the Canada-only "Overtime" released in 1995. It is rarely performed in the band's live shows.

This song was "performed" by Chicago in late 1974 as part of the 1975 Dick Clark's New Year's Rockin' Eve special, in which Chicago guitarist Terry Kath can be seen mocking the band's lip-synching by holding cue cards depicting the song's lyrics.

Personnel
 Robert Lamm – lead vocals, piano
 Terry Kath – guitar, backing vocals
 Peter Cetera – bass, backing vocals
 Danny Seraphine – drums
 Laudir de Oliveira – percussion
 Jimmy Pankow – trombone
 Lee Loughnane – trumpet
 Walter Parazaider – tenor saxophone, clarinet
 Caribou Kitchenettes – backing vocals

The "Caribou Kitchenettes" were Loughnane, de Oliveira, Pankow, Parazaider, Joanne Roccone, Brandy Maitland, Katherine Ogden, Kristy Ferguson, Linda Greene, Donna Conroy, Bob Eberhardt, John Carsello, Steve Fagin, and Richard Torres.

References

1975 songs
1975 singles
Chicago (band) songs
Songs written by Robert Lamm
Song recordings produced by James William Guercio
Columbia Records singles
Songs about presidents of the United States
Cultural depictions of Harry S. Truman